Agrius convolvuli, the convolvulus hawk-moth, is a large hawk-moth. It is common throughout Europe, Asia, Africa, Australia and New Zealand, partly as a migrant. In New Zealand, it is also known as the kumara moth, and in the Māori language as hīhue.

Description and habits
The wingspan is 80–105 mm. This hawkmoth's basic coloration is in grayish tones, but the abdomen has a broad gray dorsal stripe and pink and black bands edged with white on the sides. The hindwings are light gray with darker broad crosslines.

Its favourite time is around sunset and during the twilight, when it is seen in gardens hovering over the flowers. This moth is very attracted to light, so it is often killed by cars on highways. Its caterpillars eat the leaves of the Convolvulus, hence its Latin name "convolvuli". Other recorded food plants include a wide range of plants in the families Araceae, Convolvulaceae, Leguminosae and Malvaceae. It can be a pest of cultivated Ipomoea batatas (sweet potato or kūmara) in New Zealand and the Pacific. It feeds on the wing and has a very long proboscis (longer than its body) that enables it to feed on long trumpet-like flowers such as Nicotiana sylvestris.

The caterpillars can be in a number of different colours. As well as brown (pictured below) they have been seen in bright green and black.

Similar species
A. convolvuli is unmistakable in the eastern area of distribution, in the western area of distribution it can be mistaken for Agrius cingulatus. This species, found mainly in South and Central America, is repeatedly detected on the western shores of Europe. Agrius cingulatus can be distinguished on the basis of the clearly stronger pink colouring of the abdominal segments and a similarly coloured rear wing base. In addition, Agrius convolvuli form pseudoconvolvuli Schaufuss, 1870 has some resemblance with North American species in the genus Manduca, for instance Manduca sexta.

Gallery

References

External links
 
 Convolvulus Hawk-moth at UKMoths
 Description in Richard South The Moths of the British Isles
 Lepiforum e.V.

Agrius (moth)
Moths described in 1758
Moths of Africa
Moths of Europe
Moths of Asia
Moths of Oceania
Taxa named by Carl Linnaeus